Kadina Benki is a 1988 Indian Kannada erotic drama film directed by Suresh Heblikar and starring Vanitha Vasu, Heblikar, Girish Karnad and Mamta Rao. It is based on N D'Souza's novel of the same name.

References

External links 

1987 films
1980s Kannada-language films
1980s erotic drama films
Indian erotic drama films
Films based on Indian novels
1987 drama films